Martin Bates may refer to:

 Martin Van Buren Bates (1837–1919), American giant
 Martin W. Bates (1786–1869), U.S. Senator from Delaware

See also
 Martin Bate, British D.J.